The Odisha Rugby Football Association, abbreviated ("ORFA") is the governing body for rugby union in Odisha, India. It is a member of India Rugby Football Union with a seat on that body's Executive Council.
The Odisha RFA is the administrative body of all the state teams, including men's and women's union and sevens teams.

Administration
The following is the current organisational structure of Odisha Rugby Football Association (ORFA):

Bases

The Odisha Rugby Football Association (ORFA) has various bases across the state of Odisha; two of the main bases are Kalinga Stadium and KIIT Stadium in Bhubaneswar.

Honours

Men
 Senior National Rugby 7's Championship
 Third Place (1): 2013

 Junior National Rugby 7's Championship
 Winners (1): 2016
 Third Place (3): 2014 (KISS), 2018, 2019

 Junior National U19 Boys Rugby XV's Championship
 Winners (1): 2014 (KISS)
 Third Place (1): 2015

 Callaghan Cup National Division 2 Men's Rugby XV's
 Winners (1): 2014 (KISS)
 Third Place (1): 2014 (Bhubaneswar)

 All India Rugby 7s Inter University Games
 Third Place (1): 2018 (KIIT)

 All India Rugby XV's Inter University Games
 Third Place (1): 2018 (KIIT)

 SGFI School National U19 Boys Rugby 7's Championship
 Winners (1): 2015

 SGFI School National U17 Boys Rugby 7's Championship
 Runners-Up (3): 2015, 2016, 2018

 SGFI School National U14 Touch Rugby Championship
 Winners (2): 2017, 2018

Women
 Senior National Rugby 7's Championship
 Winners (5): 2013 (KISS), 2015, 2016, 2017, 2018
 Runners-Up (2): 2014 (KISS), 2019

 All India Women's Rugby XV's Championship
 Winners (3): 2016, 2018, 2019
 Runners-Up (1): 2017

 National U19 Girls Rugby XVs Championship
 Winners (1): 2018 (KISS)

 Junior National U18 Girls Rugby 7's Championship
 Winners (2): 2014 (KISS), 2016
 Third Place (2): 2017, 2018

 Rugby 7's Championship for Federation Cup
 Winners (1): 2017

National Games Rugby 7's
 Winners (1): 2015

 Wheelchair Rugby Nationals
 Runners-Up (1): 2019

 All India Rugby 7's Inter University Games
 Winners (1): 2018 (KIIT)
 Third Place (1): 2018 (Utkal University)

 SGFI School National U19 Girls Rugby 7's Championship
 Winners (2): 2015, 2018
 Runners-Up (1): 2016

 SGFI School National U17 Girls Rugby 7's Championship
 Winners (2): 2015, 2018

 SGFI School National U14 Touch Rugby Championship
 Runners-Up (1): 2017

See also 
 Odisha rugby union team
 Odisha rugby sevens team
 Odisha women's rugby union team
 Odisha women's rugby sevens team
 Odisha Olympic Association
 India national rugby union team
 India national rugby sevens team

References

External links 
 The Official Website of Rugby India

Rugby union in India
Sport in Odisha